Richard Baker or Richie Baker may refer to:

Arts and entertainment
 Richard Baker (broadcaster) (1925–2018), British broadcaster
 Richard Baker (composer) (born 1972), British composer and conductor
 Richard A. Baker (makeup artist) (born 1950), known as Rick, American special makeup effects artist
 Richard Baker (Disc Jockey) (DJ Richie B),British born disc Jockey (1968)
 Richard Baker (game designer), American author and game designer
 Richard Anthony Baker (1946–2016), British radio producer and author
 Richard Foster Baker (1857–1921), American director and actor
 Machine Gun Kelly (rapper) (Richard Colson Baker, born 1990), American rapper and actor
 Two Ton Baker (Dick Baker, 1916–1975), Chicago pianist, television host, and recording artist most known for novelty and children's work

Business
 Richard Baker (merchant) (1819–1875), American merchant
 Richard C. Baker (1858–1937), UK/US businessman, President of Pacific Coast Borax and Tonopah and Tidewater Railroad
 Richard Baker (American businessman, born 1946) (1946–2009), American businessman and surf apparel executive for Ocean Pacific
 Richard Baker (British businessman, born 1962), former chief operating officer of Asda Stores Ltd. and CEO of Boots Group
 Richard A. Baker (businessman) (born 1965), chairman and CEO of the Hudson's Bay Trading Company in Canada

Politics
 Richard Baker (English politician, died 1594), Member of Parliament for Lancaster, Horsham, New Shoreham and New Romney
 Richard Baker (American politician) (born 1948), American politician from Louisiana
 Richard Baker (Scottish politician) (born 1974), Scottish politician
 Richard Baker (Victorian politician) (1830–1915), Victorian state politician
 Richard Chaffey Baker (1842–1911), South Australian politician, first President of the Senate
 Richard Langton Baker (1870–1951), Canadian politician
 Richard Wingfield-Baker (1802–1881), British Liberal Party politician, MP for South Essex, 1868–1874

Religion
 Richard Baker (theologian) (1741–1818), English theological writer
 Richard H. Baker (bishop) (1897–1981), Episcopal bishop of North Carolina
 Richard Baker (Zen teacher) (born 1936), American Zen Buddhist teacher

Sports
 Richard Baker (cricketer) (born 1952), English cricketer
 Richie Baker (Irish footballer) (born 1980), former Irish footballer
 Richie Baker (English footballer) (born 1987), English footballer

Other
 Richard Baker (chronicler) (1568–1645), English chronicler
 Richard A. Baker (historian) (born 1940), historian of the United States Senate
 Richard Thomas Baker (1854–1941), Australian economic botanist
 Richard H. Baker, inventor of an electronic circuit called the "Baker clamp"
 Richard R. Baker (1909–1993), pronouncer of the Scripps National Spelling Bee

See also
Rick Baker (disambiguation)